John Bachar (March 23, 1957 – July 5, 2009) was an American rock climber.  Noted for his skill at free soloing, he ultimately died during a free solo climb. A fitness fanatic, he was the creator of the climbing training device known as the Bachar ladder.

Early life and education

Bachar was born in 1957. He grew up in Los Angeles, California, and started climbing at the bouldering hot spot of Stoney Point in the northern San Fernando Valley. After attending Westchester High School, graduating in 1974, he attended UCLA, where his father was a math professor, but dropped out to climb full-time. Obsessed with the sport, he immersed himself in books on physical training and nutrition, and soon was able to outperform his fellow climbers. Fellow students at his high school remember him scaling the exterior high school gym walls on many occasions.

Climbing career
John Long, John Yablonski, Ron Kauk and Mike Graham, whom Bachar met in the early 1970s, all free soloed with him, starting with the classic Joshua Tree route Double Cross (5.7). He also put up notorious bouldering problems in Joshua Tree such as Planet X (V6) and So High (V5).

Bachar was first noted for his climbs in Yosemite with his unroped ascents of New Dimensions (5.11a) and The Nabisco Wall, a three-pitch affair (Waverly Wafer (5.10c), either Wheat Thin (5.10c) or Butterballs (5.11c R), and Butterfingers (5.11a) as the final pitch). Noted for his physical fitness, his campsite at Camp 4 was filled with exercise equipment, including the hanging ladders since associated with his name. While attempting the bouldering problem Midnight Lightning with Kauk and Yablonski in 1978, Bachar drew the iconic lightning bolt in chalk.

Along with Ron Kauk and John Long, Bachar was part of the team that free-climbed the East face of Washington Column, ushering in a new age of free climbing with their first free ascent of Astroman.  This route, containing numerous pitches of 5.10 and 5.11 difficulty, set a new standard for long and continuously difficult free climbs.  He played a key role in making the first free ascent of the technical and difficult "boulder problem" pitch low on the route.

Bachar was a contemporary of John Long and Tobin Sorenson in a group they called the Stonemasters putting up daring new routes in the Idyllwild, California area.

Bachar posted a note in 1981 promising a "$10,000 reward for anyone who can follow me for one full day." No one took the challenge. That same year he put up Bachar-Yerian (5.11c R/X) in Tuolumne Meadows with Dave Yerian. A heady testpiece, the  vertical-to-gently-overhanging route is protected by 13 bolts (including anchor bolts), each one placed either from a stance (9) or while hanging from a hook (4). Bachar was a vocal critic of climbing tactics such as bolting on rappel, which came into vogue during the 1980s. However, at the time of the first ascent, there were critics of his decision to place certain bolts from hooks, rather than drilling and placing each bolt from a stance.

In 1986, Bachar and Peter Croft made a link up of El Capitan and Half Dome, climbing a vertical mile in under 14 hours. In the 1990s, Bachar free soloed Enterprise (5.12b) in the Owens River Gorge and The Gift (5.12c) at Red Rocks for the Masters of Stone video series.  He was featured in the documentary Bachar: One Man, One Myth, One Legend (2005) by Michael Reardon.

Personal life
Bachar lived in Mammoth Lakes, California and was Director of Design of Acopa International LLC, a company which manufactures rock climbing shoes.

On December 3, 1996 Bachar became a father when his only child Tyrus was born to Valerie Vosburg.

On August 13, 2006, Bachar was involved in a serious car accident while traveling home from the Outdoor Retailer Trade Show in Salt Lake City. He suffered multiple fractured vertebrae.

Death
On July 5, 2009, Bachar died in a free solo accident at Dike Wall near Mammoth Lakes, California.

See also
Stonemasters

References

External links

The Economist, July 16th 2009, Obituary: John Bachar

1957 births
2009 deaths
American rock climbers
Free soloists
Sports deaths in California
Mountaineering deaths
People from Mammoth Lakes, California